Urvashi Rautela (born 25 February 1994) is an Indian film actress and model who predominantly appears in Hindi films. She was crowned Reina Hispanoamericana India 2022 and represented India at the Reina Hispanoamericana 2022 pageant.

Rautela was previously crowned Miss Diva Universe 2015 and represented India at the Miss Universe 2015 pageant, but she failed to enter the Top 15 semifinals.

She made her debut in 2013 in Singh Saab the Great (2013) and has appeared in films like Sanam Re (2016), Great Grand Masti (2016), Hate Story 4 (2018) and Pagalpanti (2019).

She made her Kannada and Tamil debut with films Mr. Airavata (2014) and  The Legend  (2022) respectively.

Early life and education
Rautela was born in Haridwar on 25 February 1994 to Meera Rautela and Manwar Singh Rautela in a Garhwali Rajput family. Her hometown is Kotdwar.

Rautela was educated at St. Joseph Convent School, Kotdwar. She is an alumna of Gargi College, University of Delhi.

Pageantry career

Various pageants and fame (2009–2015)
Rautela got her first major break at age 15 in Wills lifestyle India Fashion Week. She also won the title of Miss Teen India 2009. She was the show stopper as a teen model for Lakme Fashion Week and walked the ramp at Amazon Fashion Week, Bombay Fashion Week and Dubai Fashion Week.

In 2011, Rautela won Indian Princess 2011, Miss Tourism World 2011, and Miss Asian Supermodel 2011. She also won the title of Miss Tourism Queen of the Year 2011 that was held in China and became the first Indian woman to win the pageant. She was also offered Ishaqzaade but turned it down as she wanted to focus on the Miss Universe pageant.

In 2012, she won the coveted crown of I AM She – Miss Universe India as well as the special award for Miss Photogenic. However, she had to relinquish her crown as she was underage at that time. In 2015, Rautela joined the Indian pageantry again and won the title. She represented India in Miss Universe 2015, but did not place.

Acting career

Debut and early career (2013-2017)
Rautela made her debut at Bollywood with the film Singh Saab The Great as the female lead opposite Sunny Deol. After Singh Saab The Great, Urvashi appeared in Yo Yo Honey Singh's international video album Love Dose, which released in October 2014.

Soon after, she started working in the South Indian film industry and made her debut with the Kannada film Mr. Airavata. Though the film got negative reviews from the critics, her dance sequence was praised. Sunayana Suresh writing for the Times of India noted, "Urvashi is expressive and leaves her mark in the few scenes and songs she appears in, especially with her dancing."

Later, she appeared in two other Hindi films, Sanam Re and Great Grand Masti, both were average grosser at the box office. She also did two music videos in 2016. The first was Laal Dupatta with Mika Singh and Anupama Raag and the other was Gal Bann Gayi along with Vidyut Jammwal.

In 2017, Rautela starred in a special dance sequence Haseeno Ka Deewana in the film Kaabil. She was complimented on her performance by Amitabh Bachchan. Apart from that, she made a special appearance in a Bangladeshi film Porobashinee.

Various roles and further career (2018-present)

In 2018, she appeared in the revenge drama Hate Story 4. Rachit Gupta of the Times of India stated about her performance, "Urvashi Rautela has the main role and her character has plenty to offer. She starts off as a girl dancing in a strip club, but as the story unfolds, her character gets plenty of twists, turns and reveals. There’s a lot on her table and the pretty actress handles the myriad emotions and shades with ease."

In February 2019, Rautela appeared for Anees Bazmee's comedy film Pagalpanti which was a box-office flop and generally got unfavourable reviews.

In 2020, she starred in Virgin Bhanupriya a comedy-drama directed by Ajay Lohan and produced by Shreyans Mahendra Dhariwal. The film was released through ZEE5 due to the COVID-19 pandemic.

Upcoming films
Rautela completed her film Dil Hai Gray shoot, which is the remake of Tamil film Thiruttu Payale 2. She is all set to make her Telugu film debut with Black Rose. She will make her Tamil debut with The Legend alongside Saravanan Arul. It will be made on a high budget.

Rautela will make her debut in Hollywood with the Netflix film. tentatively titled. Renata Fonte along with Michele Morrone. It will be directed by Barbara Bialowas and produced by Netflix and Tomasz Mandes.

In end of 2022, she was roped for a item number in the anticipated Telugu film Waltair Veerayya starring popular actors Chiranjeevi and Ravi Teja marking her debut to Telugu films.

She has announced her another Telugu film alongside Ram Pothineni under Boyapati Srinu direction though Instagram and Twitter.

In the media
Urvashi launched her app which gave fans information about her. She was named as the Youngest Most Beautiful Woman in the Universe 2018 by the government and tourism of Andaman & Nicobar Islands and won the Uttrakhand Maharatna Award from the chief minister of Uttrakhand.

On 24 October 2020, Urvashi became the first Indian woman to walk the runway of the Emirati label Amato which showcased on the official calendar of the Arab Fashion Week, an event endorsed by the Dubai based Arab Fashion Council.

Filmography

Films

Music videos

Web series

Awards and nominations

References

External links

 
 
 

1994 births
Indian film actresses
Female models from Uttarakhand
Living people
Garhwali people
21st-century Indian actresses
Actresses in Hindi cinema
Indian beauty pageant winners
Beauty pageant contestants from India
Actresses from Uttarakhand
Miss Universe 2015 contestants
Gargi College alumni